Association Football club names are a part of the sport's culture, reflecting century-old traditions. Club names may reflect the geographical, cultural, religious or political affiliations – or simply be the brand name of a club's primary sponsor. Because of the British origin of the modern game and the prevalence of the English language, many clubs, even outside Europe, have their names written in English.

In Europe, most clubs are named after their towns or cities (e.g. "Deportivo de La Coruña", "Liverpool F.C.", "Hamburger SV"). In South America, clubs are more likely to have names that do not bear the city's name.

Common versus official usage
It is not uncommon for a club to be known in common usage by a name other than its official name, or the name on the badge.

Other clubs are more usually known by nicknames or contractions of their full names, for instance, Vasco da Gama is usually called simply "Vasco", F.C. Internazionale Milano is contracted to Inter or Inter Milan, Sporting Clube de Portugal is often called Sporting or Sporting Lisbon. Manchester United is often shortened to Man Utd, and Lyon used instead of Olympique Lyonnais.

Some clubs are commonly referred to by their initials, such as PSG for Paris Saint-Germain and PNE for Preston North End.

Profession/education

Profession

Education
NB: Football clubs associated with colleges and universities in the United States and Canada are not listed here. These clubs are not independent of the school, and are divisions within a much larger school sports program.

Days and dates

Specific origins of club

Ethnic, social, national or religious background

Geographical features

Specific geographical features

Plants

Space

Planets

Real or mythical people

Sport

Sports societies

Values and ideals

References

Names
Club names
Names